Midsouth Emmy Awards are a division of the National Academy of Television Arts and Sciences. The Nashville, Tennessee division was founded in 1984. In addition to granting the Midsouth Emmy Awards, this division awards scholarships, honors industry veterans at the Silver Circle Celebration, conducts National Student Television Awards of Excellence, has a free research and a nationwide job bank. The chapter also participates in judging Emmy entries at the regional and national levels.

Boundaries

The academy is divided into the following boundaries and encompasses the states of North Carolina (except Asheville) and Tennessee as well as the television market of Huntsville, Alabama. These boundaries are responsible for the submission of television broadcast materials presented for awards considerations.

See also
 22nd Midsouth Emmy Awards
 23rd Midsouth Emmy Awards
 24th Midsouth Emmy Awards
 25th Midsouth Emmy Awards
 26th Midsouth Emmy Awards
 27th Midsouth Emmy Awards
 28th Midsouth Emmy Awards
 29th Midsouth Emmy Awards
 30th Midsouth Emmy Awards
 31st Midsouth Emmy Awards
 32nd Midsouth Emmy Awards
33rd Midsouth Emmy Awards

References

Midsouth *
Awards established in 1984
1984 establishments in Tennessee